Wang Ching-cheng (born 22 November 1958 in Kaohsiung) is a former Taiwanese 800m runner.

He held the national champion title in men's 800m six times. He is now the General Secretary of Chinese Taipei Athletics Association.

He has been active in sports in Taiwan and Asia, he is the member of Executive Board of Chinese Taipei Olympic Committee, the Individual Council member of Asian Athletics Association (2013-2023) and the Executive Secretary of Taoyuan Sports Federation in Taiwan.

External links 
 Bio
 Asian Athletics Association Council Member list 2019-2023

References

1958 births
Living people
Taiwanese male middle-distance runners
Sportspeople from Kaohsiung